Connecticut's 131st House of Representatives district elects one member of the Connecticut House of Representatives. It encompasses parts of Naugatuck and has been represented by Republican David Labriola since 2003.

Recent elections

2020

2018

2016

2014

2012

References

131